Arthur Montrose Cottrell (January 6, 1885 – October 12, 1918) was an American football coach and a World War I veteran. He served as the head football coach at McDaniel College–then known as Western Maryland College–in 1909, at Alfred University in 1910, and at Millersville University of Pennsylvania in 1911, compiling a career college football coaching record of 9–7–1.

Cottrell died in 1918 from the Spanish flu while stationed at Mitchel Field during World War I.

Head coaching record

References

External links
 

1885 births
1918 deaths
Alfred Saxons football coaches
McDaniel Green Terror football coaches
Millersville Marauders football coaches
Cornell University alumni
People from Washington County, Rhode Island
Deaths from the Spanish flu pandemic in New York (state)
United States Army personnel of World War I
American military personnel killed in World War I